The women's marathon event at the 1998 Commonwealth Games was held on 20 September in Kuala Lumpur.

Results

References

Marathon
1998
1998 in women's athletics
Comm
1998 Commonwealth Games
Women in Kuala Lumpur